This is a list of cultivars of the plant genus Callistemon.

See also
 Lists of cultivars

References

General references
 Australian Cultivar Registration Authority - List of Registered Cultivars derived from Australian native flora
IP Australia - Plant Breeder's Rights (PBR)

 
Lists of cultivars